The 2004–05 Ligat Nashim is the seventh season of women's league football under the Israeli Football Association. The league began on 26 January 2005, following a Supreme Court ruling which ordered Minister of Education, Culture and Sport, Limor Livnat to introduce measures to equal funding for women football clubs.

The league was won by Maccabi Holon, its second title. By winning, Maccabi Holon qualified to 2005–06 UEFA Women's Cup.

League format
With a record number of 19 teams registered to play, the league was split into two divisions, Northern and Southern. Following a single round of play, the top four teams in each division progressed to the Championship Group, which was played as double round-robin tournament, while the rest of the teams were placed in the bottom group, which was played as a single round-robin tournament.
For the second phase, all points gathered by the teams in the first phase was erased and both groups started with a clean slate.

Regular season results

Northern Division
With 9 teams in the division, teams played 8 matches in the regular season.

Southern Division
With 10 teams in the division, teams played 9 matches in the regular season.

Playoff results

Championship group

Bottom group

References

External links
Ligat Nashim 2004-05 Eran R, 8 April 2015, israblog.co.il 
2004-2005 Women's League One.co.il 

Ligat Nashim seasons
1
women
Israel